Sunsari District is one of 14 districts in Koshi province of Nepal.
According to the 2011 Nepal census, the population was 753,328. The district headquarters is located in Inaruwa.

The area was originally part of Morang District but became its own district in 1962 when Nepal was divided into 14 zones and 75 districts.
Major cities in Sunsari district are Inaruwa], Itahari, Jhumka, Dharan, and Duhabi. Some religious places of this district are Budha Subba Temple, Ramdhuni, Chataradham, Baraha, Bishnupaduka, Dantakali, and Pindeshor Babadham.

The lowlands of Limbuwan, present day Sunsari, Morang and Jhapa Districts was collectively known as Morang District since the time of King Mung Mawrong Hang of the 7th century.

Administration 
The district consists of two Sub-metropolitan Cities, four urban municipalities and six rural municipalities. These are as follows:

Sub-metropolitian cities
 Itahari
 Dharan

Municipalities
Inaruwa
 Duhabi 
 Ramdhuni-Bhasi 
 Barahachhetra Municipality

Rural municipalities
 Koshi 
 Gadhi  
 Barju 
 Bhokraha, Sunsari
 Harinagara 
 Dewanganj

Geography and climate

Demographics
At the time of the 2011 Nepal census, Sunsari District had a population of 763,487. Of these, 28.8% spoke Nepali, 28.5% Maithili, 11.7% Tharu, 9.6% Urdu, 2.9% Uranw/Urau, 2.7% Limbu, 2.2% Rai, 2.1% Newar, 1.8% Tamang, 1.6% Bantawa, 1.3% Magar, 0.7% Chamling, 0.6% Bengali, 0.6% Bhojpuri, 0.6% Gurung, 0.5% Kulung 0.3% Bhujel, 0.3% Hindi, 0.3% Majhi, 0.3% Rajasthani, 0.3% Sampang, 0.2% Rajbanshi, 0.2% Sherpa, 0.2% Sunuwar, 0.2% Thulung, 0.2% Yakkha, 0.1% Awadhi, 0.1% Bahing, 0.1% Danuwar, 0.1% Dumi, 0.1% Khaling, 0.1% Magahi, 0.1% Wambule and 0.3% other languages as their first language.

In terms of ethnicity/caste, 12.1% were Tharu, 11.5% Musalman, 9.2% Chhetri, 7.9% Hill Brahmin, 6.6% Rai, 4.3% Yadav, 4.0% Koiri/Kushwaha, 3.8% Newar, 3.4% Musahar, 3.2% Limbu, 3.1% Jhangad/Dhagar, 2.3% Tamang, 2.3% Teli, 2.2% Kami, 2.0% Magar, 1.6% Dhanuk, 1.5% Bantar/Sardar, 1.2% Chamar/Harijan/Ram, 1.1% Halwai, 1.0% Damai/Dholi, 1.0% Gurung, 0.8% Kathabaniyan, 0.8% Khatwe, 0.6% Gharti/Bhujel, 0.6% Majhi, 0.6% Mallaha, 0.6% Marwadi, 0.6% other Terai, 0.5% Terai Brahmin, 0.5% Dhimal, 0.5% Hajam/Thakur, 0.5% Sanyasi/Dasnami, 0.4% Dusadh/Paswan/Pasi, 0.4% Kulung, 0.4% Sarki, 0.3% Bantawa, 0.3% Bengali, 0.3% Gaderi/Bhedihar, 0.3% Kalwar, 0.3% Kewat, 0.3% Khawas, 0.3% Sarbaria, 0.3% Tatma/Tatwa, 0.2% Badhaee, 0.2% Chamling, 0.2% Dom, 0.2% Kayastha, 0.2% Kumal, 0.2% Kumhar, 0.2% Rajbanshi, 0.2% Rajput, 0.2% Sherpa, 0.2% Sudhi, 0.2% Sunuwar, 0.1% Amat, 0.1% Badi, 0.1% Baraee, 0.1% Bhote, 0.1% Danuwar, 0.1% Dhobi, 0.1% Kurmi, 0.1% Lohar, 0.1% Munda, 0.1% Nuniya, 0.1% Pattharkatta/Kushwadiya, 0.1% Punjabi/Sikh, 0.1% Rajbhar, 0.1% Rajdhov, 0.1% Sonar, 0.1% Thakuri, 0.1% Thulung, 0.1% Yakkha and 0.3% others.

In terms of religion, 73.3% were Hindu, 11.5% Muslim, 6.9% Kirati, 4.4% Buddhist, 1.9% Prakriti, 1.5% Christian, 0.1% Jain and 0.4% others.

In terms of literacy, 68.0% could read and write, 2.0% could only read and 29.9% could neither read nor write.

Former VDCs 

 Amaduwa
 Amahibelha
 Aurabarni(Now Gadhi Gaupalika
 Bakalauri
 Barahachhetra
 Basantapur
 Bhadgaun Sinawari (now Ramdhuni-Bhasi Municipality)
 Bhaluwa (now Duhabi-Bhaluwa Municipality)
 Bharoul
 Bhokraha
 Bishnupaduka (now Dharan Municipality)
 Chadbela
 Chhitaha
 Chimdi
 Dewanganj
 Dharan Municipality
 Duhabi-Bhaluwa Municipality
 Dumaraha
 Gautampur
 Ghuski
 Harinagar
 Haripur
 Inaruwa Municipality
 Itahari Municipality
 Jalpapur
 Kaptanganj
 Laukahi
 Madheli
 Madhesa
 Madhuwan
 Madhyeharsahi
 Mahendranagar
 Narshinhatappu
 Panchakanya (now Dharan Municipality)
 Paschim Kasuha
 Prakashpur
 Purbakushaha
 Ramdhuni-Bhasi Municipality
 Ramganj Belgachhi
 Ramganj Senuwari
 Ramnagar Bhutaha
 Sahebgunj
 Satterjhora
 Simariya
 Singiya (now Ramdhuni-Bhasi Municipality)
 Sonapur
 Sripurjabdi
 Tanamuna

See also
 Zones of Nepal

References

External links
 Official Web Portal of Sunsari District

 
Districts of Nepal established in 1962
Districts of Koshi Province